John Bennett is a British drummer, and a founding member of the progressive doom/death metal band, The Prophecy.  With The Prophecy, Bennett has completed several tours of Europe and the United States, and has also recorded three albums.

Bennett also played drums for fellow doom metal band My Dying Bride for two years, filling in for Shaun Steels while Steels recovered from an ankle injury.  Bennett played as a session musician on the A Line of Deathless Kings album.  In 2007 he announced that he could not continue to play with My Dying Bride.

Discography

Equipment
Premier Percussion Cabria Exclusive (10”, 12”, 14”Ft, 22” & 14”Sn)
Tama 12” side accent snare
DW 9000 Hi Hat 
DW 5000 Pedal (DBL) 
Premier Percussion Hardware 
22” Zildjian Z Custom power ride 
20” Zildjian A Custom China
18” Zildjian Z Custom projection crash 
16” Zildjian Z Custom rock crash 
16” Zildjian Avedis rock crash 
14” Zildjian Oriental china 
13” Zildjian A Custom mastersound hi-hats 
12” Zildjian Z Custom splash 
8” Zildjian A Custom splash 
Roland TD20BK V Drums 
Hardcase cases 
Vic Firth 5A Sticks

References

Living people
Place of birth missing (living people)
Year of birth missing (living people)
English heavy metal drummers